Richie Schlentz (born February 28, 1999) is an American professional soccer player who plays as a defender for USL Championship club Hartford Athletic.

College career
Schlentz played college soccer at Villanova University between 2017 and 2020, making 41 appearances for the Wildcats tallying 3 assists.

Professional career

Reading United
Schlentz joined Reading United during the 2019 USL League Two season. He scored his first goal for the club against GPS Portland Phoenix in the opening round of the playoffs and played a strong role in their run to the final.

Hartford Athletic
On April 13, 2021, Schlentz signed with Hartford Athletic in the USL Championship.

Career statistics

References

External links
 
 

1999 births
American soccer players
Association football defenders
Hartford Athletic players
Living people
Soccer players from Pennsylvania
USL Championship players
Villanova Wildcats men's soccer players